Daniel Rinkert (born 11 December 1987) is a German politician from the SPD. He became a member of the Bundestag in October 2022, replacing Rainer Keller who died.

Political career 
Rinkert unsuccessfully contested the Neuss I constituency in the 2017 and 2021 elections.

References

See also 
 List of members of the 20th Bundestag

1987 births
Living people
Social Democratic Party of Germany politicians
Members of the Bundestag 2021–2025
Members of the Bundestag for North Rhine-Westphalia
21st-century German politicians